Judith Heather Howat  (née McLay; born 20 May 1935) is a former New Zealand international lawn bowler. She won a gold medal representing her country in the women's pairs at the 1990 Commonwealth Games, and was part of the New Zealand women's four that finished second at the 1992 World Outdoor Bowls Championship.

Early life and family
Howat was born Judith Heather McLay in Taumarunui on 20 May 1935, the daughter of Charles and Florence McLay. She was educated at Raurimu District High School. In 1955, she married Peter Charles Howat, and the couple went on to have four children.

Howat had a varied work career. She worked for the New Zealand Post Office for six years, and owned a hairdressing salon for six years. She spent seven years as a taxi driver, and was a computer operator for Wellington Newspapers for six years.

Bowls career
At the 1990 Commonwealth Games in Auckland, Howat won the gold medal in the women's pairs with Marie Watson. In the final, they defeated Australia 23–13. Four years later, at the 1994 Commonwealth Games, Howat competed in the women's singles, finishing seventh.

At the 1992 World Outdoor Bowls Championship in Ayr, Howat won the silver medal in the women's fours, alongside Marlene Castle, Marie Watson and Adrienne Lambert. Paired with Marie Watson, she finished fourth in the women's pairs, losing to Zambia in the bronze-medal match. The New Zealand women won the women's team bronze medal.

She won five medals at the Asia Pacific Bowls Championships.

Howat won the 1988 singles title, the 1999 pairs title and the 2000 fours title at the New Zealand National Bowls Championships when bowling for the Wellington Bowling Club.

Honours and awards
In 1990, Howat was awarded the New Zealand 1990 Commemoration Medal. In the 2005 New Year Honours, she was appointed a Member of the New Zealand Order of Merit, for services to lawn bowls.
In 2013, she was inducted into the Bowls New Zealand Hall of Fame and the Sport Legends of Wellington.

References

1935 births
Living people
People from Taumarunui
New Zealand female bowls players
Commonwealth Games gold medallists for New Zealand
Commonwealth Games medallists in lawn bowls
Bowls players at the 1990 Commonwealth Games
Bowls players at the 1994 Commonwealth Games
Members of the New Zealand Order of Merit
20th-century New Zealand women
21st-century New Zealand women
Medallists at the 1990 Commonwealth Games